Wilfried Bendjamin Balima (born 20 March 1985) is a retired Burkinabé international footballer who spent the majority of career with Moldovan National Division club Sheriff Tiraspol as a right defender.

Career

Club
In June 2017, Balima left Sheriff Tiraspol after twelve years with the club. Balima re-signed for Sheriff Tiraspol on 20 July 2017.

On 24 January 2020, Balima announced that he had retired from football, and that he had joined the coaching staff of Sheriff Tiraspol.

International
Balima played for the Burkina Faso under-21 team and the senior national team from Burkina Faso.

Career statistics

Club

International

Statistics accurate as of match played 13 January 2015

International goals

Honours
US Ouagadougou
 Burkinabé Cup (1): 2004–05
 Burkinabé SuperCup (1): 2004–05
Sheriff Tiraspol
 Moldovan National Division (13): 2005–06, 2006–07, 2007–08, 2008–09, 2009–10, 2011–12, 2012–13, 2013–14, 2015–16, 2016–17, 2017, 2018, 2019
 Moldovan Cup (7): 2005–06, 2007–08, 2008–09, 2009–10, 2014–15, 2016–17, 2018–19
 Moldovan Super Cup (4): 2007, 2013, 2015, 2016
 CIS Cup (1): 2009

References

External links
 
 Player profile at Football-Lineups

1985 births
Living people
Burkinabé footballers
FC Sheriff Tiraspol players
Moldovan Super Liga players
Burkina Faso international footballers
2010 Africa Cup of Nations players
2012 Africa Cup of Nations players
2013 Africa Cup of Nations players
Expatriate footballers in Moldova
People from Bobo-Dioulasso
2015 Africa Cup of Nations players
Association football fullbacks
US Ouagadougou players
20th-century Burkinabé people
21st-century Burkinabé people
Burkinabé expatriate sportspeople in Moldova
FC Sheriff Tiraspol non-playing staff